Seychelles competed in the 2010 Commonwealth Games held in Delhi, India, from 3 to 14 October 2010.

Medals

Medalist

See also
 2010 Commonwealth Games

References

External links
  Times of india

Nations at the 2010 Commonwealth Games
2010 in Seychelles